The Jubilee Medal "300 Years of the Russian Navy" was a state commemorative medal of the Russian Federation awarded to deserving citizens to denote the 300th anniversary of the Russian Navy. It was established on February 10, 1996 by Presidential Decree No. 176.

Medal statute 
The Jubilee Medal "300 Years of the Russian Navy" was awarded to citizens of the Russian Federation, soldiers in the service in the Navy, Marines, Forces of the Federal Border Service of Russia, if previously awarded state awards of the Russian Federation, RSFSR, or USSR, and that impeccably served on ships or naval aircrews for at least 10 years, or in other parts of the navy for 20 years or more, to naval personnel who took part in the fighting against the Nazi invaders and the Japanese militarists in 1941-1945, admirals, generals, officers, warrant officers (ensigns), sailors and petty officers who are in reserve (retired) or that were discharged from the Armed Forces of the Russian Federation, the Armed Forces of the USSR, the Federal Border Service of the Russian Federation or Naval Border Troops of the KGB, if they were previously awarded state awards of the Russian Federation, RSFSR or USSR and impeccably served in the Navy, Marines or Naval Forces of the Federal Border Service of the Russian Federation or Naval Border Troops of the KGB on ships or in  naval aviation for 10 years or more or in other parts of the navy for 20 years or more; to civilian personnel on support ships of the Navy, seafarers and marine scientists, of river, fishing, research, or expeditionary fleets, if they previously received state awards of the Russian Federation, RSFSR or USSR and worked flawlessly on vessels for 15 years or more, to designers, developers, managers of design bureaus, research institutions and organizations, educational institutions, heads of central government shipbuilding industry, the workers of basic professions directly involved in the construction and repair of ships and vessels, if they previously received state awards of the Russian Federation, RSFSR or the USSR and worked flawlessly in their area of specialty or profession for 20 years or more, to heads of the central basin management bodies, heads of research institutions, educational institutions, sea, river, fishing, research, and expeditionary fleets, if they previously received state awards of the Russian Federation, RSFSR or USSR and worked flawlessly in these areas for more than 20 years.

Presidential Decree 1099 of September 7, 2010 removed the Jubilee Medal "300 Years of the Russian Navy" from the list of state awards of the Russian Federation. It is no longer awarded.

Medal description 
The Jubilee Medal "300 Years of the Russian Navy" is a 32mm in diameter silvered tombac circular medal with raised rims on both sides.  On the obverse in relief, in the background at the lower left, the Admiralty building, at center, the left profile bust of Peter the Great. Along the top edge, the inscription in relief "300 Years of the Russian Navy".  On the reverse, the relief inscription "1696-1996", in the lower part, laurel and oak branches around the image of crossed anchors (sea and river).
  
The medal is suspended by a ring through the award's suspension loop to a standard Russian pentagonal mount covered with an overlapping 24 mm wide white silk moiré ribbon with two 7 mm wide blue stripes located 1 mm from the ribbon's edges.

Recipients (partial list) 
The individuals below were all recipients of the Jubilee Medal "300 Years of the Russian Navy".
 Politician Vladimir Borisovich Rushailo
 Director of the FSB Nikolai Platonovich Patrushev
 Fleet Admiral Vladimir Yegorov
 Colonel General Gennady Nikolayevich Troshev
 Former Airborne Lieutenant General, politician Vladimir Anatolyevich Shamanov
 Hero of the Russian Federation, Major General Timur Avtandilovich Apakidze
 Chairman of the Russian Central Bank Viktor Vladimirovich Gerashchenko
 Hero of the Soviet Union, test pilot Viktor Georgiyevich Pugachyov
 Fleet Admiral Vladimir Ivanovich Kuroyedov
 Scientist (mathematician and physicist) Gury Ivanovich Marchuk
 Former GRU Colonel, politician Vladimir Vasilievich Kvachkov
 Former Army General, former Interior Minister Anatoly Sergeevich Kulikov
 AEROFLOT Director Vitaly Gennadyevich Savelyev
 Former Prime Minister of Russia Viktor Stepanovich Chernomyrdin

See also 

 Awards and decorations of the Russian Federation
 Russian Navy
 List of Russian naval engineers

References

External links 
 Official site of the Commission under the President of the Russian Federation on State Awards In Russian
 The Russian Gazette  In Russian

Civil awards and decorations of Russia
Russian awards
Awards established in 1996
Tricentennial anniversaries